Grand Tournalin (3,379m) is a mountain of the Monte Rosa Massif in the Pennine Alps in Aosta Valley, Italy. It is the highest mountain between the Ayas Valley and Valtournenche. The mountain is composed of two summits, the north being higher than the south summit by just 9m.

Climbing
The mountain was first climbed in 1873 by Jean-Antoine Carrel and Edward Whymper. It is exclusively climbed from the south due to the poor quality of the rock on its north side. It is recommended for expert hikers only, but the reward on the summit is one of the best views of the Alps, with great views of the mighty Matterhorn and Monte Rosa, as well as many other famous peaks of the Graian and Pennine Alps.

References

Mountains of the Alps
Alpine three-thousanders
Mountains of Aosta Valley